Majala may refer to several places in Estonia:
Majala, Tartu County, village in Elva Parish, Tartu County
Majala, Võru County, village in Võru Parish, Võru County